Yegor Anatolyevich Okorokov (born 18 April 1989) is a Russian former professional football player.

Club career
He made his professional debut for FC Zenit Saint Petersburg on 31 October 2007 in the Russian Cup game against FC Tom Tomsk.

He played in the Russian Football National League for FC Dynamo Saint Petersburg in 2010.

External links
 
 

1989 births
Sportspeople from Kaunas
Living people
Russian footballers
Association football midfielders
FC Zenit Saint Petersburg players
FC Dynamo Saint Petersburg players
FC Petrotrest players
FC Oryol players